Eurhaphidophora is a genus of camel crickets in the monotypic tribe Rhaphidophorini. Species can be found in: China, Indo-China and Peninsular Malaysia.

Species 
The Orthoptera Species File lists:
 Eurhaphidophora ampla Gorochov, 2010
 Eurhaphidophora angusta Gorochov, 2010
 Eurhaphidophora bispina Gorochov, 2010
 Eurhaphidophora bona Gorochov, 2012
 Eurhaphidophora laosi Gorochov, 2010
 Eurhaphidophora nataliae Gorochov, 1999 - type species
 Eurhaphidophora orlovi Gorochov, 2010
 Eurhaphidophora rotundata Gorochov, 2010
 Eurhaphidophora tarasovi Gorochov, 2010
 Eurhaphidophora truncata Bian & Shi, 2016
 Eurhaphidophora visibilis Gorochov, 2010

References 

Rhaphidophoridae
Ensifera genera
Orthoptera of Asia
Orthoptera of Indo-China